Miss World 1984, the 34th edition of the Miss World pageant, was held on 15 November 1984 at the Royal Albert Hall in London, UK. The winner was Astrid Carolina Herrera from Venezuela. She was crowned by Miss World 1983, Sarah-Jane Hutt of the United Kingdom. The 1st and 2nd runners-up were Constance Ellen (Connie) Fitzpatrick from Canada, and Lou-Anne Caroline Ronchi from Australia. The event was viewed by 17.1 million people in the UK.

Results

Placements

Continental Queens of Beauty

Contestants

Notes

Returns

Last competed in 1968:
 
Last competed in 1979:
 
Last competed in 1982:

Withdrawals
  – Issues with franchise-holding both in national and in international pageants.
  – Government banned Indonesian girls to compete such as beauty pageants.

References

External links
 Pageantopolis – Miss World 1984

Miss World
1984 in London
1984 beauty pageants
Beauty pageants in the United Kingdom
Events at the Royal Albert Hall
November 1984 events in the United Kingdom